Brettus cingulatus is a species of jumping spider of the genus Brettus. It is found in Myanmar and India.

The species was first described in 1895 from a single specimen. The female was originally misidentified as another species, B. albolimbatus. Males and females look very different due to sexual dimorphism. Only in 2017 was the species rediscovered near Mumbai, India, far away from its original discovery in Myanmar.

The epithet "cingulatus" means "wearing a belt" in Latin, "albolimbatus" refers to white limbs.

Diet and behaviour
This spider preys upon other spiders. To capture web-building spiders, the typical strategy is to stand at the edge of the web and pluck upon the silken strings with its pedipalps, trying out numerous patterns/rhythms until an effective one is found, then to lunge and capture/stab the spider when it gets lured over(aggressive mimicry). Brettus cingulatus does not adhere to spider silk and can walk on webs with ease, but usually does not go into the webs of other spiders.

In studies, this spider also readily stalked insects, approaching at fast speeds, then slowing down and eventually lunging at the insect to capture it. However, they prefer to eat web-building spiders.

References

Salticidae
Endemic fauna of Myanmar
Spiders of Asia
Spiders described in 1895